"Heaven's Kitchen" is Bonnie Pink's fifth single from the album Heaven's Kitchen. The single was released under the Pony Canyon label on April 18, 1997. "Heaven's Kitchen" was also released as a vinyl (limited picture) on April 18, 1997.

Track listing

CD

Limited Picture Vinyl

Oricon Sales Chart 

1997 singles
Bonnie Pink songs
Pony Canyon singles
1997 songs
Songs written by Bonnie Pink